"Fragile" is a song by American hip hop recording artist Tech N9ne, taken from his thirteenth studio album Something Else (2013). "Fragile" was released on July 17, 2013 as the album's second single. It was produced by ¡Mayday!, Daniel "Keys" Perez and Ralfy "FAFA" Valencia. The song features vocals from Kendrick Lamar, ¡Mayday! and Kendall Morgan.

"Fragile" details each rappers disdain for music journalists and their criticism of their music. Ironically, the song was met with generally positive reviews from music critics. The song peaked at number 38 on the US Billboard Hot R&B/Hip-Hop Songs chart. A music video was released on February 9, 2014 featuring the artists rapping and singing in an abandoned warehouse.

Background

On July 17, 2013, "Fragile" featuring Kendrick Lamar, ¡Mayday! and Kendall Morgan was premiered via Complex. Following its premiere, the song was made available for purchase with the iTunes pre-order for Something Else, also being released to Amazon.com as the album's second official single.

The song was inspired by Max Bell, a writer for LA Weekly who referred to Tech N9ne's Paid Dues performance as "gimmicky and redundant". He would later thank the writer during an interview, for giving him the inspiration to make the song. The song details each rapper's disdain for media criticism, as they address the critics and journalists that write about their music. Both artists rap with rapid-fire, aggressive verses, while Wrekonize and Bernz of ¡Mayday! and Kendall Morgan both sing the song's chorus.

Writing and production 
The song's composition begun after Strange Music label-mate ¡Mayday! sent Tech N9ne the song with their and Kendall Morgan's vocals on it. He said the introspective chorus made him take a moment to reflect on his own rhymes. He detailed himself creating his verse saying, "After I wrote my verse, it was my second show in Seattle. We did two shows, because I sold out both shows. There was like 2,000 the first night, and another 2,000 on the second night. So it was like, 'Whoa, we sold out both shows!' I was already tired from the night before, and we already had booked the studio time in Seattle. I went there, and I finished the last four bars of the verse I wrote. I wrote most of the verse—the first eight bars—on bus. It was getting closer to the show, and I wrote the last four bars at the studio because, our meet and greets aren’t an hour anymore. There’s like 300 people or 400 people, so you’re there until 6 pm now instead of 3 or 4. Now we got to go the studio, and I gotta be on stage at 9 pm, so it’s coming down to the wire I still have to eat and whatnot. But I did it, and after I did it, I’m like, 'Ooh, the verse is elite.'"

Following him writing his own verse, Tech N9ne decided he wanted another major rapper on the song after him. He stated, "It was already elite, so I needed somebody who could come after me, and there aren’t too many who can do it." After contemplating over which rapper would be featured on the track, even sending it to Eminem with hopes he would get on board, Tech N9ne decided to feature American rapper Kendrick Lamar on the song. This track would be Tech N9ne and Lamar's second collaboration.

The song's production was created by ¡Mayday!, Ralfy "FAFA" Valencia, and Danny "Keys" Perez. The instrumental is based around a brokenhearted guitar and piano-based beat, along with a simple drum pattern for the verses, before escalating with keys and guitar riffs for the hook.

Critical reception 
"Fragile" was met with generally positive reviews from music critics. Arasia Graham of HipHopDX said, ""Fragile" finds Tech N9ne and Kendrick Lamar annihilating a clear-cut beat through their bars with a concise delivery, while expressing disdain for critics. And Kendall Morgan's emotive vocals entice the track making it a contender for best on the album." Steve Jones of USA Today also named it one of the album's best songs.

Sha Be Allah of The Source called the song "a slow tempo, rimshot driven track blessed with lyrics from arguably the best of the underground and mainstream." AllMusic's David Jeffries stated, ""Fragile" ups the album artistically with jazz club ambience and the great Kendrick Lamar as guest star." Jonathan Sawyer of Hypetrak said, the song "is impressive all the way around. From the instrumentation to the hook provided by Morgan and ¡Mayday! to the spitfire verses from Tech N9ne and Kendrick, this is easily one of the standouts from N9ne's forthcoming Something Else album."

Music video 
On December 3, 2013, Tech N9ne shot the music video for "Fragile" with director Anthony Devera. Kendrick Lamar, Bernz and Wrekonize of ¡Mayday! and Kendall Morgan were all present in their respective roles. On February 9, 2014, the music video was released for "Fragile". The video features the artists rapping and singing in an abandoned warehouse.

Charts

Weekly charts

Year-end charts

Certifications

References 

2013 singles
2013 songs
Tech N9ne songs
Kendrick Lamar songs
Songs written by Kendrick Lamar